An Article 14 Direction is a term used in British planning law for a directive issued by the British Government which prevents a Local Planning Authority granting planning permission for a specific proposal. It has no time limit, so remains in force until explicitly lifted. It is typically used to allow a regional government office more time to consider proposals.

See also
Conservation in the United Kingdom
Town and country planning in the United Kingdom

Town and country planning in the United Kingdom
Conservation in the United Kingdom